James George Smith (August 20, 1819 – September 16, 1849) was one of eight founders of Beta Theta Pi, a prominent college fraternity founded at Miami University in 1839. He was never in good health and after graduating from Miami University in 1840, he became a farmer in the Oakland area of  Wilmington, Ohio, and died on September 16, 1849, from what might have been smallpox.  He is the only founder of Beta Theta Pi for which a photo does not exist (or is yet to be found). Samuel Taylor Marshall, one of the other founders of Beta Theta Pi, described Smith as a "...pale, studious, quiet fellow in delicate health." Smith was buried in the Smith family cemetery and reinterred in the Miami Cemetery at Corwin, Ohio in November 1867.

See also
List of Beta Theta Pi members

External links

Sources
 Brown, James T., ed., Catalogue of Beta Theta Pi, New York: 1917.

Miami University alumni
1819 births
1849 deaths
Beta Theta Pi founders